The 2003 Texas Longhorns football team represented the University of Texas at Austin in the 2003 NCAA Division I-A football season. The team was coached by head football coach Mack Brown and led on the field by Chance Mock and redshirt freshman quarterback Vince Young.

Schedule

Season summary

Oklahoma State

Source: ESPN

Texas Tech

References

Texas
Texas Longhorns football seasons
Texas Longhorns football